Munnar Monorail Project is a project of the government of Kerala in Munnar. The mono rail is to be constructed in the same area where the erstwhile Kundala Valley Railway ran nearly a century earlier. As part of the project, a preliminary study led by Devikulam MLA S Rajendran was conducted. Primary study was submitted to railway department and railway will conduct feasibility study for showing green flag. The initial stage of the project aims at reviving 5 km of the original line. Extension of the remaining 35 km will be done if the project succeeds. The state Tourism minister Kadakmpally Surendran has said that the renewed railway line would draw more number of tourists to the hill stations.

Funding

The project would be developed under public-private-partnership model and Tata Tea Limited will be the private partner in the state government's plan to revive the light railway in Munnar. The project will be designed similar to Darjeeling Rail model.

References 

Monorails in India
Rail transport in Kerala